The Golden Goggle Awards, presented by the USA Swimming Foundation, is an awards ceremony which recognizes and honors the accomplishments of swimmers who represented the United States, that is USA Swimming National Team members, over the last year. The awards were established in 2004 with the first awards ceremony held in November of the same year in New York City. There are eight main categories: Breakout Performer of the Year, Coach of the Year, Perseverance Award, Relay Performance of the Year, Male Race of the Year, Female Race of the Year, Male Athlete of the Year, and Female Athlete of the Year. Nominees in each category are announced in advance of the awards ceremony and recipients of each award are revealed at the ceremony itself. Winners for each award are determined by a selection panel and fan votes. The awards ceremony serves as a fundraiser for the foundation, with seats and tables available for purchase and proceeds going to the foundation and other humanitarian efforts such as aid relief for those affected by Hurricane Katrina. The dress code for attendees is black tie. Localities hosting the annual ceremony vary and include cities such as New York City, Los Angeles, and Miami.

Ceremony locations
 2004: New York City
 2005: Hammerstein Ballroom, New York City
 2006: Beverly Hills, California
 2007: The Beverly Hilton, Beverly Hills, California
 2008: New York Hilton, New York City
 2009: The Beverly Hilton, Beverly Hills, California
 2010: New York City
 2011: Los Angeles
 2012: Marriott Marquis, New York City
 2013: JW Marriott Los Angeles L.A. LIVE, Los Angeles
 2014: New York City
 2015: Los Angeles
 2016: New York City
 2017: Los Angeles
 2018: New York City
 2019: Los Angeles
 2020: Virtual
 2021: Faena Hotel Miami Beach, Miami
 2022: Marriott Marquis, New York City (host: Ahmed Fareed)

Female Athlete of the Year

2004: Natalie Coughlin
2005: Katie Hoff
2006: Katie Hoff
2007: Katie Hoff
2008: Natalie Coughlin
2009: Rebecca Soni
2010: Rebecca Soni
2011: Missy Franklin
2012: Missy Franklin
2013: Katie Ledecky
2014: Katie Ledecky
2015: Katie Ledecky
2016: Katie Ledecky
2017: Katie Ledecky
2018: Katie Ledecky
2019: Simone Manuel
2020: Not awarded due to the COVID-19 pandemic
2021: Katie Ledecky
2022: Katie Ledecky

Male Athlete of the Year

2004: Michael Phelps
2005: Aaron Peirsol
2006: Brendan Hansen
2007: Michael Phelps
2008: Michael Phelps
2009: Ryan Lochte
2010: Ryan Lochte
2011: Ryan Lochte
2012: Michael Phelps
2013: Ryan Lochte
2014: Michael Phelps
2015: Michael Phelps
2016: Michael Phelps
2017: Caeleb Dressel
2018: Ryan Murphy
2019: Caeleb Dressel
2020: Not awarded due to the COVID-19 pandemic
2021: Caeleb Dressel
2022: Bobby Finke

Breakout Performer of the Year

2004: Larsen Jensen
2005: Jessica Hardy
2006: Cullen Jones
2007: Ben Wildman-Tobriner
2008: Rebecca Soni
2009: Tyler Clary
2010: Missy Franklin
2011: Alex Meyer
2012: Katie Ledecky
2013: Chase Kalisz
2014: Maya DiRado
2015: Jordan Wilimovsky
2016: Lilly King
2017: Mallory Comerford
2018: Michael Andrew
2019: Regan Smith
2020: Not awarded due to the COVID-19 pandemic
2021: Lydia Jacoby
2022: Leah Hayes

Coach of the Year

2004: Bob Bowman
2005: Eddie Reese
2006: Eddie Reese
2007: Bob Bowman
2008: Bob Bowman
2009: Eddie Reese
2010: Gregg Troy
2011: Gregg Troy
2012: Bob Bowman
2013: Bruce Gemmell
2014: Bruce Gemmell
2015: Bruce Gemmell
2016: Dave Durden
2017: Greg Meehan
2018: Greg Meehan
2019: Mike Parratto
2020: Not awarded due to the COVID-19 pandemic
2021: Gregg Troy
2022: Anthony Nesty

Perseverance Award

2004: Kaitlin Sandeno
2005: Brendan Hansen
2006: Erik Vendt
2007: Ryan Lochte
2008: Eric Shanteau
2009: Dana Vollmer
2010: Kate Ziegler
2011: Peter Vanderkaay
2012: Jessica Hardy
2013: Megan Romano
2014: Haley Anderson and Andrew Gemmell
2015: Allison Schmitt
2016: Anthony Ervin
2017: Matt Grevers
2018: Micah Sumrall
2019: Nathan Adrian
2020: Not awarded due to the COVID-19 pandemic
2021: Annie Lazor
2022: Leah Smith

Relay Performance of the Year
2004: Women's 4 × 200 meter freestyle relay at Olympic Games (Natalie Coughlin, Carly Piper, Dana Vollmer, Kaitlin Sandeno)
2005: Women's 4 × 200 meter freestyle relay at World Championships (Natalie Coughlin, Katie Hoff, Whitney Myers, Kaitlin Sandeno)
2006: Men's 4 × 100 meter freestyle relay at Pan Pacific Championships (Michael Phelps, Neil Walker, Cullen Jones, Jason Lezak)
2007: Men's 4 × 200 meter freestyle relay at World Championships (Michael Phelps, Ryan Lochte, Klete Keller, Peter Vanderkaay)
2008: Men's 4 × 100 meter freestyle relay at Olympic Games (Michael Phelps, Garrett Weber-Gale, Cullen Jones, Jason Lezak)
2009: Men's 4 × 100 meter freestyle relay at World Championships (Michael Phelps, Ryan Lochte, Matt Grevers, Nathan Adrian)
2010: Women's 4 × 100 meter medley relay at Pan Pacific Championships (Natalie Coughlin, Rebecca Soni, Dana Vollmer, Jessica Hardy)
2011: Women's 4 × 100 meter medley relay at World Championships (Natalie Coughlin, Rebecca Soni, Dana Vollmer, Missy Franklin)
2012: Women's 4 × 100 meter medley relay at Olympic Games (Missy Franklin, Rebecca Soni, Dana Vollmer, Allison Schmitt)
2013: Women's 4 × 100 meter freestyle relay at World Championships (Missy Franklin, Natalie Coughlin, Shannon Vreeland, Megan Romano)
2014: Women's 4 × 200 meter freestyle relay at Pan Pacific Swimming Championships (Shannon Vreeland, Missy Franklin, Leah Smith, Katie Ledecky)
2015: Women's 4 × 200 meter freestyle relay at World Championships (Missy Franklin, Leah Smith, Katie McLaughlin, Katie Ledecky)
2016: Men's 4 × 100 meter freestyle relay at Olympic Games (Caeleb Dressel, Michael Phelps, Ryan Held, Nathan Adrian)
2017: Women's 4 x 100 meter medley relay at World Championships (Kathleen Baker, Lilly King, Kelsi Worrell, Simone Manuel)
2018: Men's 4 × 100 meter medley relay at Pan Pacific Swimming Championships (Ryan Murphy, Andrew Wilson, Caeleb Dressel, Nathan Adrian)
2019: Women's 4 x 100 meter medley relay at World Championships (Regan Smith, Lilly King, Kelsi Dahlia, Simone Manuel)
2020: Not awarded due to the COVID-19 pandemic
2021: Men's 4 × 100 metre medley relay at Olympic Games (Ryan Murphy, Michael Andrew, Caeleb Dressel, Zach Apple)
2022: Women's 4 × 200 metre freestyle relay at World Championships (Claire Weinstein, Leah Smith, Katie Ledecky, Bella Sims)

Female Race of the Year
2004: Amanda Beard for 200 meter breaststroke at Olympic Games
2005: Kate Ziegler for 1500 meter freestyle at World Championships
2006: Whitney Myers for 200 meter individual medley at Pan Pacific Championships
2007: Kate Ziegler for 1500 meter freestyle at TYR Meet of Champions
2008: Rebecca Soni for 200 meter breaststroke at Olympic Games
2009: Ariana Kukors for 200 meter individual medley at World Championships
2010: Rebecca Soni for 200 meter breaststroke at Pan Pacific Championships
2011: Missy Franklin for 200 meter backstroke at 2011 World Aquatics Championships
2012: Katie Ledecky for 800 meter freestyle at Olympic Games
2013: Katie Ledecky for 1500 meter freestyle at World Championships
2014: Katie Ledecky for 1500 meter freestyle at Pan Pacific Championships
2015: Katie Ledecky for 200 meter freestyle at World Championships
2016: Simone Manuel for 100 meter freestyle at Olympic Games
2017: Lilly King for 100 meter breaststroke at World Championships
2018: Kathleen Baker for 100 meter backstroke at the 2018 Phillips 66 National Championships
2019: Regan Smith for 200 meter backstroke at World Championships
2020: Not awarded due to the COVID-19 pandemic
2021: Lydia Jacoby for 100 meter breaststroke at Olympic Games
2022: Katie Ledecky for 800 meter freestyle at World Championships

Male Race of the Year
2004: Michael Phelps for 100 meter butterfly at Olympic Games
2005: Ian Crocker for 100 meter butterfly at World Championships
2006: Michael Phelps for 200 meter individual medley at Pan Pacific Championships
2007: Michael Phelps for 200 meter butterfly at World Championships
2008: Michael Phelps for 100 meter butterfly at Olympic Games
2009: Michael Phelps for 100 meter butterfly at World Championships
2010: Ryan Lochte for 200 meter individual medley at Pan Pacific Championships
2011: Ryan Lochte for 200 meter individual medley at World Championships
2012: Nathan Adrian for 100 meter freestyle at Olympic Games
2013: Ryan Lochte for 200 meter individual medley at World Championships
2014: Connor Jaeger for 1500 meter freestyle at Pan Pacific Championships
2015: Jordan Wilimovsky for 10 km at World Championships
2016: Michael Phelps for 200 meter butterfly at Olympic Games
2017: Caeleb Dressel for 100 meter butterfly at World Championships
2018: Ryan Murphy for 100 meter backstroke at Pan Pacific Championships
2019: Caeleb Dressel for 100 meter butterfly at World Championships
2020: Not awarded due to the COVID-19 pandemic
2021: Bobby Finke for 800 meter freestyle at Olympic Games
2022: Bobby Finke for 800 meter freestyle at World Championships

Impact Award
2004: Dick Ebersol
2008: National Collegiate Athletic Association (NCAA)
2012: James Mulva
2016: Michael Phelps
2021: Cecil Gordon and Bob Vincent
2022: Bill Maxson and Carol Zaleski

Athlete Humanitarian Award
2012: Eric Shanteau

Team Leadership & Inspiration Award
2016: Elizabeth Beisel

Honorary Award
 2020: 1980 US Olympic Swim Team and "front-line workers keeping Americans safe"

See also
USA Swimming
List of sport awards

References

Swimming awards
American sports trophies and awards
Swimming in the United States